Globulariopsis is a genus of flowering plants belonging to the family Scrophulariaceae.

Its native range is South African Republic.

Species:

Globulariopsis adpressa 
Globulariopsis montana 
Globulariopsis obtusiloba 
Globulariopsis pumila 
Globulariopsis stricta 
Globulariopsis tephrodes 
Globulariopsis wittebergensis

References

Scrophulariaceae
Scrophulariaceae genera
Taxa named by Robert Harold Compton